The eastern frogfish (Batrachomoeus dubius) is a bottom-dwelling fish endemic to coastal eastern Australia, from Fraser Island, Queensland to Kiama, New South Wales. It is an ambush predator with a large expandable stomach, capable of swallowing crustaceans, molluscs and other fishes whole.

Habitat
The fish is found at depths of 1–150 m along the continental shelf but also estuaries and inshore reefs. Rarely seen in the open, they shelter on rocky reefs and among seaweed or under rocks and in underwater caves.

Morphology
The eastern frogfish has a flattened head with a wide mouth surrounded by a distinct fleshy 'beard'.  Its colour varies from mottled brown to pale grey or bluish-grey, with two broad bands and scattered splotches along the body. Juveniles are paler with broad bands.  They reach a maximum length of 35 cm.

References

External links
 

eastern frogfish
Marine fish of Eastern Australia
eastern frogfish